Cerotainia macrocera is a species of robber flies in the family Asilidae.

References

macrocera
Articles created by Qbugbot
Insects described in 1823